David Michaud (born November 10, 1988) is an American professional mixed martial artist currently competing in the Welterweight division. A professional competitor since 2009, he formerly competed for the Professional Fighters League, Legacy Fighting Alliance, the UFC and Titan FC.

Background
Michaud, who is an Oglala Lakota Native American, was born and raised on the Pine Ridge Indian Reservation in Pine Ridge, South Dakota. Michaud competed in wrestling, football, and baseball at Pine Ridge High School. Michaud won All-State honors in football, was an All-Conference selection in baseball, and in wrestling, Michaud finished first for 189 lbs. his senior season and also had a second-place finish as a sophomore. Overall, he held an overall high school record of 91-19 and went 15-1 during his senior season. Michaud was also the valedictorian of his reservation high school graduating class and held a 4.0. Michaud originally went to South Dakota State University to play football, but eventually turned his attention to wrestling after competing in only two matches his freshman year. Michaud was also a standout academically.

Mixed martial arts career

Early career
Michaud competed as a Light Heavyweight and Middleweight as an amateur, winning Ring Wars Championships in both divisions and compiling a record of 4-1. He began his amateur career at age 15.

Michaud then made his professional mixed martial arts debut in 2009 competing as a Welterweight in regional promotions across The Dakotas. Michaud compiled a record of 4-0, before auditioning for The Ultimate Fighter in 2012.

The Ultimate Fighter
Michaud appeared in the first episode of The Ultimate Fighter 16. Michaud lost via submission (arm-triangle choke) against Eddy Ellis during the entry round.

After TUF Michaud returned to the regional scene in The Dakotas, where he was able to string together a three-fight win streak, before being signed by the UFC.

Ultimate Fighting Championship
Michaud made his promotional debut, as a short notice replacement for an injured Danny Mitchell and faced Li Jingliang at UFC 173.  Jingliang defeated Michaud split decision.

Michaud faced Garett Whiteley in a Lightweight bout on December 13, 2014 at UFC on Fox 13.  Michaud won the fight via unanimous decision.

Michaud faced Olivier Aubin-Mercier on April 25, 2015 at UFC 186. He lost the fight via submission in the third round and was subsequently released from the promotion.

Bellator MMA/Legacy Fighting Alliance
On July 10, 2018, it was announced that Michaud had signed a contract with Bellator. He faced Corey Davis at Bellator 204 on August 17, 2018 and won the fight via knockout in the first round.

Michaud faced future UFC fighter Christian Aguilera on February 2, 2019 at LFA 59. He won the bout via TKO in the second round.

Professional Fighters League
He faced Sadibou Sy in the quarterfinals at PFL 7 on October 11, 2019. The fight ended in a draw with Cooper advancing. In the semifinals at the same event, he faced Chris Curtis and won by knockout in the second round. Michaud faced Ray Cooper III in the finals at PFL 10 on December 31, 2019. He lost the fight via TKO in the second round.

Michaud was set to face Rory MacDonald on April 29, 2021 at PFL 2 as the start of the 2021 PFL Welterweight tournament. On April 8, Michaud announced that he had to pull out of the bout due to medicals discovering a congenital heart condition, congenital bicuspid aortic valve with dilated aortic root, which put him at risk of aortic dissection. His future in MMA is also uncertain.

Mixed martial arts record

|-
|Loss
|align=center|18–6
|Ray Cooper III
|TKO (body kick and punches)
|PFL 10
|
|align=center|2
|align=center|2:56
|New York City, New York, United States
|
|-
|Win
|align=center|18–5
|Glaico França
|Decision (majority)
|rowspan=2 | PFL 7
|rowspan=2 | 
|align=center| 3
|align=center| 5:00
|rowspan=2 | Las Vegas, Nevada, United States
|
|-
|Win
|align=center|17–5
|John Howard
|Decision (unanimous)
|align=center| 2
|align=center| 5:00
|
|-
| Win
| align=center|16–5
| Handesson Ferreira
| TKO (punches)
| PFL 4
| 
| align=center|1
| align=center|4:37
| Atlantic City, New Jersey, United States
| 
|-
| Loss
| align=center|15–5
| Sadibou Sy		
| TKO (liver kick and punches)
| PFL 1
| 
| align=center|1
| align=center|0:17
| Uniondale, New York, United States
| 
|-
| Win
| align=center| 15–4
| Christian Aguilera
| TKO (punches)
| Legacy Fighting Alliance 59
| 
| align=center| 1
| align=center| 4:14
| Phoenix, Arizona, United States
| 
|-
|Win
|align=center|14–4
|Fernando Gonzalez Trevino
|TKO (punches)
|Combate Americas- Mexico vs. USA
|
|align=center|2
|align=center|1:07
|Tucson, Arizona, United States
|
|-
|Win
|align=center|13–4
|Corey Davis
|KO (punches)
|Bellator 204
|
|align=center|1
|align=center|1:42
|Sioux Falls, South Dakota, United States
|
|-
|Win
|align=center|12–4
|Tyler Milner
|Submission (rear-naked choke)
|Sparta Combat League 63
|
|align=center|1
|align=center|2:01
|Rapid City, South Dakota, United States
|
|-
| Loss
| align=center| 11–4
| Ciro Rodrigues
| TKO (punches)
| Legacy Fighting Alliance 19
| 
| align=center| 1
| align=center| 1:57
| Sioux Falls, South Dakota, United States
| 
|-
| Win
| align=center| 11–3
| Jake Lindsey
| TKO (injury)
| Legacy Fighting Alliance Fight Night 1
| 
| align=center| 3
| align=center| 1:14
| Sioux Falls, South Dakota, United States
| 
|-
| Win
| align=center| 10–3
| Cody Wilson
| KO (punch)
| EB: Beatdown 20
| 
| align=center| 3
| align=center| 0:15
| New Town, North Dakota, United States
| 
|-| 
| Loss
| align=center| 9–3
| Dhiego Lima
| Decision (unanimous)
| Titan FC 39: Cavalcante vs. Healy
| 
| align=center| 5
| align=center| 5:00
| Coral Gables, Florida, United States
| 
|-
|Win
|align=center|9–2
|Chris Hugh
|Submission (guillotine choke)
|RFA 37
|
|align=center|1
|align=center|1:44
|Sioux Falls, South Dakota, United States
|
|-
|Loss
|align=center|8–2
|Olivier Aubin-Mercier
|Submission (rear-naked choke)
|UFC 186
|
|align=center|3
|align=center|3:24
|Montreal, Quebec, Canada
|
|-
| Win
|align=center| 8–1
|Garett Whiteley
| Decision (unanimous)
|UFC on Fox: dos Santos vs. Miocic
|
|align=center|3
|align=center|5:00
|Phoenix, Arizona, United States
|
|-
| Loss
|align=center| 7–1
|Li Jingliang
| Decision (split)
|UFC 173
|
|align=center|3
|align=center|5:00
|Las Vegas, Nevada, United States
|
|-
| Win
|align=center| 7–0
|Carey Vanier
| Submission (guillotine choke) 
|Dakota FC 17
|
|align=center|1
|align=center|4:30
|Fargo, North Dakota, United States
|Catchweight bout of 160 lbs.
|-
| Win
|align=center| 6–0
|Ian Stonehouse
| Submission (rear-naked choke)
|Victory FC 2
|
|align=center|2
|align=center|3:00
|Rapid City, South Dakota, United States
|
|-
| Win
|align=center| 5–0
|Mark Scudder
| Decision (unanimous)
|Victory FC 2
|
|align=center|3
|align=center|5:00
|Rapid City, South Dakota, United States
|Catchweight bout of 175 lbs.
|-
| Win
|align=center| 4–0
|Derek Abram
| TKO (punches)
|Crowbar MMA
|
|align=center|1
|align=center|4:04
|Grand Forks, North Dakota, United States
|
|-
| Win
|align=center| 3–0
|Cody Skidmore
| TKO (punches)
|Fury Fights 8
|
|align=center|1
|align=center|0:42
|Brookings, South Dakota, United States
|
|-
| Win
|align=center| 2–0
|Bryant Craven
| Submission (kimura)
|EDP: Vindication
|
|align=center|1
|align=center|1:56
|Rapid City, South Dakota, United States
|
|-
| Win
|align=center| 1–0
|Curtis Johnson
| TKO (punches)
|Fury Fights 7
|
|align=center|1
|align=center|0:40
|Brookings, South Dakota, United States
|
|-

See also
 List of male mixed martial artists

References

External links

Living people
1988 births
American male mixed martial artists
Mixed martial artists utilizing wrestling
Mixed martial artists from South Dakota
Oglala people
People from Pine Ridge, South Dakota
South Dakota State University alumni
Ultimate Fighting Championship male fighters